The following is a list of notable Swedish Americans, including both original immigrants who obtained American citizenship and their American descendants. 
 
To be included in this list, the person must have a Wikipedia article showing they are Swedish American or must have references showing they are Swedish American and are notable.

List

Entertainment

Actors
 Maud Adams, Swedish-born, Bond girl
 Ann-Margret, Swedish-born, actress and singer
 Candice Bergen, actress and fashion model, father of Swedish descent
 Edgar Bergen, actor and radio performer
 Ingrid Bergman, Swedish-born
 Nadia Bjorlin, soap opera actress, Swedish father
Rowan Blanchard, American actress
Veda Ann Borg, American film actress
 James Coburn, film actor
 Arthur Donaldson (1869-1955), Swedish-American actor
 Joseph J. Dowling, film American actor; his mother was Swedish
 Stan Freberg, animation voice actor, author, recording artist, comedian, radio personality, puppeteer and advertising creative director
 Greta Garbo, Swedish-born, film actress
 Signe Hasso, film actress
 Garrett Hedlund, actor, father is of Swedish ancestry
Martha Hedman, Swedish-born, American stage actress
 Tippi Hedren, film actress, paternal grandparents were immigrants from Sweden
 Liza Huber, soap opera, television and stage actress
 Gunilla Hutton, film actress
 Tor Johnson, actor and wrestler, Swedish-born
 Van Johnson, film and television actor, of part Swedish descent
 Val Kilmer, actor, mother was of Swedish descent
 Joel Kinnaman, actor, Swedish-born, American father and Swedish-Jewish mother
 Melinda Kinnaman, actress; half-sister of Joel; a Swedish and American citizen
 Kris Kristofferson, country music songwriter, singer and actor, father was of Swedish descent
 Caroline Lagerfelt, stage, film, and television actress
 Jack Larson, actor
 Eric Linden, film actor
 Viveca Lindfors, stage and film actress
Helen Lindroth, Swedish-born; screen and stage actress
 Susan Lucci, mother of part Swedish descent; soap opera actress

 Jennette McCurdy, actress of Swedish descent
Carlotta Nillson, Swedish-born, Broadway actress
 Anna Q. Nilsson, Swedish-born, silent film actress
 Warner Oland, film actor
 Nancy Olson, film and television actress
 Olivia Olson, actress and voiceover actress; her birth mother is Swedish
 Mary-Louise Parker, film actress, star in TV series Weeds, of 1/4 Swedish descent
 Dorothy Peterson, actress
 Jeremy Renner, actor, of part Swedish descent
 Izabella Scorupco, actress
 Inger Stevens, Swedish-born, film and television actress
 Erik Per Sullivan, Malcolm in the Middle actor, Swedish mother
 Gloria Swanson, silent film actress
 Bo Svenson, Swedish-born American actor, known for his roles in American genre films of the 1970s and 1980s
 Karl Swenson, film and television actor, radio personality, of Swedish parentage
 Burr Tillstrom, puppeteer and the creator of Kukla, Fran and Ollie
 Kari Wahlgren, voiceover actress
 Maiara Walsh, actress
 Irene Ware, actress in Hollywood; was in 40 movies, 1932-1940
 Richard Widmark, father was of Swedish descent

Music

 Leroy Anderson, Swedish immigrant parents, composer
 Theresa Andersson, singer-songwriter
 Gustav Åhr (Lil Peep) rapper, singer and songwriter 
 Herbert Blomstedt, orchestral conductor
 David Carlson, composer
Olive Fremstad, Swedish-born, mezzo-soprano and soprano opera singer
Jerry Garcia, singer and guitarist of the Grateful Dead
 Emilie Hammarskjöld, composer
 Howard Hanson, composer, conductor, educator and music theorist
Ragnar Hasselgren, Swedish-born singer and recording artist, who was active on the American West Coast from the 1920s through the 1970s
Catherine Christer Hennix, composer
 Joe Hill, Swedish-born, songwriter, labor activist and member of the Industrial Workers of the World
 Quincy Jones III, Swedish-born mother, composer, music producer, film producer and author
 Ben Jorgensen, writer and singer for Armor For Sleep
 Kris Kristofferson, influential country music songwriter, singer and actor
 MC Lars, rapper
 Peggy Lee, Swedish/Norwegian grandparents, jazz singer and songwriter
 Neil Levang, musician
 Jim Lindberg, singer-songwriter for the American punk rock band Pennywise
 Kerry Livgren, musician-songwriter for the American band Kansas
 Nils Lofgren, singer-songwriter, multi-instrumentalist, member of Bruce Springsteen's E Street Band
Marjorie Lynn, singer who gained fame from WLS-AM radio in Chicago and the National Barn Dance, the precursor to the Grand Ole Opry
 Freddy Moore, singer-songwriter
Ricky Nelson, singer-songwriter
 Harry Nilsson, singer-songwriter
Jack Noren, jazz drummer and vocalist
 Ted Nugent, singer-songwriter, guitarist and political activist
Birgit Ridderstedt, folk singer and producer
 Todd Rundgren, singer-songwriter
 Ilya Salmanzadeh, singer-songwriter and producer
 Grace Slick, singer-songwriter
 Cat Stevens, singer-songwriter, mother Swedish
 Taylor Swift, country singer
 Hughie Thomasson, singer and guitarist
 Cal Tjader, Swedish parents, jazz musician
 Theodor Uppman, Swedish parents, opera singer
 Elle Varner, Singer, songwriter, guitarist (Father is half-Swedish)
 Astrid Varnay, Swedish-born, opera singer
 Henry Vestine, guitarist, son of Ernest Harry Vestine
 Donnie Wahlberg, singer of pop group New Kids On The Block, actor and film producer

Other
Ludwig Ahgren, won the award for "Streamer of the Year" in 2022 and is one of the biggest gaming streamers on Twitch and YouTube.
Mary Katherine Campbell, two-time Miss America winner in 1922 and 1923; mother was half Swedish
 Gretchen Carlson, journalist, co-host of Fox & Friends on Fox News Channel, former Miss America
 Leticia Cline, model
 Steve Dahl, longtime Chicago radio disc jockey and talk personality, influential early "shock jock"
 Cary Fukunaga, director, writer, film producer and cinematographer
 Stephen Gyllenhaal, director
 Mitch Hedberg, comedian
Verne Lundquist, sportscaster, currently employed by CBS Sports television
 Ozzie Nelson, Swedish immigrant father, entertainer, radio and television actor
 Hjalmar Peterson, vaudeville artist
 Nena von Schlebrügge, fashion model in the 1950s and 1960s; born in Mexico but of German and Swedish descent; mother of actress Uma Thurman
 Steven Soderbergh, film producer, screenwriter, cinematographer, editor and Oscar-winning director, of part Swedish descent

Artists
John Alvin Anderson, Swedish-American photographer who is known for photographing Sioux Indians at the Rosebud Indian Reservation in South Dakota from 1885 until 1930
 Carl Oscar Borg, Swedish-born, painter, known for themes of the Southwestern United States
Edward William Carlson, Swedish-American miniature portrait painter
 John F. Carlson, Swedish-born, Impressionist artist, author of Carlson's Guide to Landscape Painting
 Peter David Edstrom, Swedish-born, sculptor
 Arnold Friberg, American illustrator and painter noted for his religious and patriotic works. He is perhaps best known for his 1975 painting The Prayer at Valley Forge, a depiction of George Washington praying at Valley Forge.
 Bud Grace, cartoonist
 Paul Granlund, sculptor
 Albinus Hasselgren, painter and sculptor
 Knute Heldner, Swedish-born, American artist
 Gustavus Hesselius, Swedish-born, painter
 John Hesselius, portraitist
 Magnus Colcord "Rusty" Heurlin (1895-1986), Swedish-born, Swedish-American artist and painter best known for his depictions of Alaskan landscapes
 Oscar Jacobson, Swedish-born American painter and museum curator. From 1915 to 1945, he was the director of the University of Oklahoma's School of Art
  Emil Janel, artist
 Lester Johnson, painter
Olof Krans, Swedish-born, artist and painter
 Michael Kors, fashion designer
 Hope Larson, illustrator and cartoonist
 Karl Larsson, Swedish-born, painter, engraver and sculptor
Evan Lindquist, artist, printmaker, first artist laureate of Arkansas
Carl Lotave, painter of portraits, illustrator, and sculptor
Bror Julius Olsson Nordfeldt, Swedish-born, artist
Arvid Nyholm, artist known primarily as a portrait and landscape painter
Claes Oldenburg, Swedish-born, sculptor, best known for his public art
 David Oscarson, Swedish American pen designer
Paul Kuniholm Pauper, Swedish mother, Norwegian father; sculptor
Susan Mohl Powers, sculptor
Henry Reuterdahl, Swedish-American painter highly acclaimed for his nautical artwork. He had a long relationship with the United States Navy
 Birger Sandzén, Swedish-born, painter
 Haddon Sundblom, creator of Santa Claus images for the Coca-Cola Company
 John August Swanson, Swedish father, visual artist, painter
 Gustaf Tenggren, Swedish-born, illustrator
 Carl E. Wallin, Swedish-born, artist and painter
Gunnar Widforss, Swedish-born, artist specializing in landscapes
John Philip Hultberg, American expressionist and realist painter with parents of Swedish descent

Engineers

 Jonas Wenström, Swedish electrical engineer. Invented the Three-phase Electric Power System, which was the foundation for the world-renowned company ASEA (later ABB)
 Ernst Alexanderson, Swedish-born, electrical engineer
 Carl David Anderson, physicist
 Ragnar Benson, Chicago building contractor
Ernst Julius Berg, Swedish-born, American electrical engineer. A pioneer of radio, he produced the first two-way radio voice program in the United States
Stig Bergström, Swedish-American paleontologist who described the conodont family Paracordylodontidae and in 1974, he described the multielement conodont genus Appalachignathus from the Middle Ordovician of North America
 Chester Carlson, physicist, inventor, and patent attorney
 John Ericsson, Swedish-born, inventor and mechanical engineer
Carl Friden, Swedish-born, American mechanical engineer and businessman who founded the Friden Calculating Machine Company 
 Clarence "Kelly" Johnson, Swedish-born parents, aircraft engineer and aeronautical innovator, considered one of the most talented and prolific aircraft design-engineers
 John B. Johnson, Swedish-born, electrical engineer and physicist
 Clarence Hugo Linder, of Swedish descent, electrical engineer, founding member of the National Academy of Engineering
 Harry Nyquist, Swedish-born, engineer, important contributor to information theory
 John W. Nystrom, engineer Swedish born, American civil engineer, inventor, and author. He served as an assistant Secretary and Chief Engineer of the United States Navy during the American Civil War.
Arvid Reuterdahl, Swedish-American engineer, scientist and educator
 Glenn T. Seaborg, Nobel Prize laureate, chemist prominent in the discovery and isolation of ten transuranic elements including plutonium, americium, curium, berkelium, californium, einsteinium, fermium, mendelevium, nobelium and seaborgium, which was named in his honor

Entrepreneurs and businesspeople
 Christopher Ahlberg, computer scientist and entrepreneur
 Gene Amdahl, computer architect and entrepreneur
Ragnar Benson, Swedish-born building contractor & philanthropist
John L. Anderson (shipbuilder), preeminent figure in Washington state maritime industries in the first half of the twentieth century, particularly ferry service, shipbuilding, and ship-based tourism. He ran the largest ferry fleet on Lake Washington for three decades. 
Asplundh Tree Expert Company, American company which specializes in tree pruning and vegetation management for utilities and government agencies and was founded by three Swedish-American brothers  
John Brynteson, Swedish-born, Alaskan mining executive
 Curt Carlson, founder of Carlson
 Carl G. Cromwell, Texas-based oil and aviation pioneer
 John Erlander, Swedish-born, founder of Rockford Union Furniture Company
 Ernest O. Estwing, Swedish-born, founder of Estwing Manufacturing Company
 Carl Friden, Swedish-born, founder of Friden, Inc.
John Alfred Headlund, Swedish-born American architect
 Oscar Hedstrom, Swedish-born, co-founder of the Indian  Manufacturing Company
 Walter Hoving, Swedish-born, head of Tiffany & Company
Andrew Johnson (architect), Swedish–American architect and contractor. He designed 61 documented or attributed buildings in Panola County, Mississippi and at least 16 more in North Mississippi, Tennessee, and Arkansas. Several of his works are listed on the U.S. National Register of Historic Places
 J. Erik Jonsson, Swedish immigrant parents, co-founder and former president of Texas Instruments Incorporated, mayor of Dallas and philanthropist
 Arvid Emanuel Kallen, Swedish-born, General Motors executive
 George Kellgren, Swedish-born, founder of Kel-Tec, manufacturer of firearms.
 Michael Kors, founder of Michael Kors Holdings Limited (KORS)
 Reginald Lenna, philanthropist and CEO of Blackstone Company
 Eli Lilly, philanthropist and founder of Eli Lilly and Company
Josua Lindahl, Swedish American geologist and paleontologist. He was a professor at Augustana College from 1878 to 1888, then was Illinois State Geologist until 1893. He is the namesake of the extinct Cyprinidae subspecies Aphelichthys lindahlii
Lars-Eric Lindblad, Swedish-American entrepreneur and explorer, who pioneered tourism to many remote and exotic parts of the world. He led the first tourist expedition to Antarctica in 1966
 Erik Lindblom, Swedish-born, Alaskan mining executive
 Charles Magnus Lindgren, Swedish-born, shipping executive
 John R. Lindgren, banking executive with State Bank of Chicago, founder of Haugan & Lindgren banking firm in Chicago
Karl G. Malmgren, architect in the Pacific Northwest
 William Matson, Swedish-born, founder of Matson Navigation Company
 John W. Nordstrom, Swedish-born, co-founder of the Nordstrom department store chain
 G.L. Norrman, Swedish-born, important architect in the southeastern United States
 Pehr August Peterson, Swedish-born, business executive and founder of the Swedish American Hospital
 Rudolph A. Peterson, Swedish-born, President and CEO of Bank of America
Norman Ralston, co-founder of Aero Air
 Cristina Stenbeck, Swedish father, American mother, businesswoman
 Carl Strandlund, Swedish-born, inventor and entrepreneur
 Gideon Sundbäck, Swedish-born, inventor, commercialized the zipper, son-in-law of colleague Peter Aronson
 David Sundstrand, Swedish-born American inventor of the 10-key adding machine, 10-key calculator keyboard, a 10-keypad now used on computer keyboards
Carl A. Swanson, Swedish-born, founder of Swanson
Swante M. Swenson, Swedish-born, founder of the SMS Ranches
Nils F. Testor, Swedish-born, founder of Testor Corporation
 Charles Rudolph Walgreen, founder of Walgreens, one of America's largest pharmacy chains; Swedish-born parents
Charles Rudolph Walgreen Jr., President of Walgreens
Charles R. Walgreen III, President of Walgreens
Henrik Wallin, Savannah, Georgia-based architect
Magnus Wahlström, Swedish American entrepreneur and later a philanthropist who founded Bridgeport (machine tool brand)
Carl Wickman, founder of Greyhound Lines

Military
 William Anderson (Medal of Honor), Medal of honor recipient in 1878
 William Y. Anderson, Swedish-born American fighter ace of World War II
 Buzz Aldrin, pilot and astronaut, Lunar Module Pilot on Apollo 11, the first lunar landing
Eric Bergland, Swedish-born American military officer who fought in the American Civil War as a volunteer officer, graduated from West Point at the top of his class, served his adopted country with distinction as an officer of the regular army, a professor of his alma mater, and a Western explorer, and married a cousin of the wife of president Rutherford B. Hayes
 Richard I. Bong, US Army Air Force and Medal of Honor recipient
 Arleigh Burke, US Navy Admiral
 John A. Dahlgren, US Navy Rear Admiral
John Ernest Dahlquist, US Army four-star general
 Eric G. Gibson, Swedish-born, US Army soldier and Medal of Honor recipient
 Roger Hanson, Confederate States Army General

Emil Lewis Holmdahl, machine gunner, soldier of fortune, spy, gun runner, and treasure hunter who fought under John J. Pershing in the Spanish–American War in the Philippines, under Lee Christmas in Central America, under Francisco Madero, Pancho Villa, and Venustiano Carranza in the Mexican Revolution, and under John J. Pershing in World War I. In 1926, Holmdahl was accused of having stolen Francisco Pancho Villa's head.
Gregory G. Johnson, US Navy admiral
Charles Linn, Swedish-born, captain in the Confederate States Navy
Oscar Malmborg, lieutenant colonel in the Union Army
 Charles Momsen, US Navy vice admiral
Charles J. Stolbrand, Swedish-born brigadier general in American Civil War
 Ivor Thord-Gray, Swedish-born, mercenary soldier

Politics and public service

 Elmer L. Andersen, 30th Governor of Minnesota
 C. Elmer Anderson, 28th Governor of Minnesota
 John B. Anderson, US Representative from Illinois and an Independent candidate in the 1980 presidential election
Sydney Anderson, US Representative from Minnesota
 Wendell Anderson, 33rd Governor of Minnesota, from January 4, 1971, to December 29, 1976
 August H. Andresen, US Representative from Minnesota
 Robert Bergland, US Representative from Minnesota, 20th United States Secretary of Agriculture
 Joseph A. A. Burnquist, 19th Governor of Minnesota
 George H. W. Bush, former president of the US
 George W. Bush, former president of the US
 Arne Carlson, 37th Governor of Minnesota
 Carl Richard Chindblom, US Representative from Illinois
 Byron Dorgan, US Senator
 Adolph Olson Eberhart, 17th Governor of Minnesota
 Mamie Eisenhower, wife of Dwight D. Eisenhower and First Lady of the United States from 1953 to 1961
C.J.A. Ericson, was an Iowa businessman and politician
 Thomas Frankson, 22nd Lieutenant Governor of Minnesota
 Orville Freeman, 29th Governor of Minnesota, 16th United States Secretary of Agriculture
 Tipper Gore, wife of Vice President Al Gore
 Jennifer Granholm, Governor of the state of Michigan; of Finnish-Swedish ancestry
 John Hoeven, US Senator
 Mike Holm, Swedish-born American politician and the longest-serving Minnesota Secretary of State
David Hultgren, former politician and judge in Illinois
 Johnny Isakson, 2nd generation, Republican Senator from Georgia since 2005
 Daniel of St. Thomas Jenifer, Founding Father, signer of the U.S. Constitution
 John Albert Johnson, 16th Governor of Minnesota
 Joseph B. Johnson, Swedish-born, 70th Governor of Vermont
 Magnus Johnson, Swedish-born, US Senator from Minnesota
 Tim Johnson, US Senator from South Dakota, father was of mostly Swedish ancestry
 U. Alexis Johnson, US diplomat
 Harold LeVander, 32nd Governor of Minnesota
 John Lind, Swedish-born, 14th Governor of Minnesota
 Charles August Lindbergh, Congressman for 6th District of Minnesota from 1907 to 1917
 Gottfrid Lindsten, 32nd Lieutenant Governor of Minnesota
 Zoe Lofgren, Member of the US House of Representatives from California
 Ernest Lundeen, US Senator from Minnesota
 Dan Lungren, Member of the US House of Representatives from California
 Warren G. Magnuson, US Senator from Washington
Hans Mattson, Swedish American politician. He served with distinction as a colonel in the American Civil War (1861–65) and in 1869 became the Minnesota Secretary of State. He later served as United States Consul General in India
 Gregory J. Newell, former US Ambassador to Sweden (1985–1989); US Assistant Secretary of State for International Organization Affairs (1982–1985); former assistant secretary of State for President Ronald Reagan
 Albin Walter Norblad, Sr, Swedish-born, 19th Governor of Oregon (father of Albin Walter Norblad, Jr, grandfather of Albin Walter Norblad III)
 Albin Walter Norblad, Jr, Member of the US House of Representatives from Oregon (son of Albin Walter Norblad, Sr, father of Albin Walter Norblad III)
 Albin Walter Norblad III, attorney, judge of the Oregon Circuit Court (son of Albin Walter Norblad, Jr, grandson of Albin Walter Norblad, Sr)
 Floyd B. Olson, 22nd Governor of Minnesota
 Lyndon Lowell Olson, Jr., politician and diplomat
 James Oscarson, Swedish American politician
 Alfred J. Pearson, Swedish born-American educator and diplomat
 William Rehnquist, lawyer, jurist and a political figure, who served as an Associate Justice of the Supreme Court of the United States and later as the Chief Justice of the United States
Adam Strohm, Swedish-American librarian. Strohm served as chief librarian of the Detroit Public Library from 1912 until his retirement in 1941
 Adolphus Frederic St. Sure, United States District Court Judge
 Carl Skoglund, socialist
 Charles Stenholm, Member of the US House of Representatives from Texas
 Don Sundquist, 47th Governor of Tennessee
 David Ivar Swanson, Swedish-American Illinois state representative for the Republican Party who served 24 years in the Illinois state legislature between the years 1922-46 and 1948–50
 Tim Walberg, US Representative
 Monrad Wallgren, 13th Governor of Washington, Member of the US House of Representatives and the US Senator from Washington
 Earl Warren, California district attorney of Alameda County, the 30th Governor of California, and the 14th Chief Justice of the United States (from 1953 to 1969);  of Swedish and Norwegian descent
 Luther Youngdahl, 27th Governor of Minnesota
 Oscar Youngdahl, Member of the US House of Representatives from Minnesota
G. Aaron Youngquist, Swedish-American lawyer and public prosecutor. He served as Minnesota Attorney General and as the Assistant U.S. Attorney General who successfully prosecuted Al Capone for federal income tax evasion

Religious personalities
Conrad Bergendoff, Lutheran theologian and historian
Marcus Borg, religious author
Paul Carlson, medical missionary of the Evangelical Covenant Church
Erland Carlsson, Swedish-born, Lutheran minister and one of the founders and President of the Augustana Synod
K. G. William Dahl, Swedish-born, Lutheran minister, founder of Bethphage Inner Mission in Axtell, Nebraska
John Alexis Edgren, Swedish-born, Baptist minister, founder of Bethel University in St. Paul, Minnesota
Lars Paul Esbjörn, Swedish-born, Lutheran minister and one of the founders of the Augustana Synod of the Lutheran church
Nils Frykman, Swedish-born, evangelist, hymnwriter and prominent figure in the Evangelical Covenant Church 
Tuve Hasselquist, Swedish-born, Lutheran minister and founding president of the Augustana Synod
Johannes Alfred Hultman, Swedish-born, evangelist, hymnwriter and founding member of the Evangelical Covenant Church
Eric Jansson, Swedish-born, pietist leader
Andrew Nelson, missionary, linguist and lexicographer associated with the Seventh-day Adventist Church
 Russell M. Nelson, renowned heart surgeon, college professor, President of the Church of Jesus Christ of Latter-day Saints
Thomas S. Monson, President of the Church of Jesus Christ of Latter-day Saints
Eric Norelius, Swedish-born, Lutheran minister and one of the founders and President of the Augustana Synod
David Nyvall, Swedish-born, immigrant and church leader who helped shape the Evangelical Covenant Church and establish North Park University
Dale G. Renlund, junior member of the Quorum of the Twelve Apostles in the Church of Jesus Christ of Latter-day Saints
Andreas Rudman, Swedish-born, pioneer Lutheran minister and pastor of Gloria Dei (Old Swedes') Church
Carl Aaron Swensson, Lutheran minister and President of Bethany College
Gustaf Unonius, Swedish-born, Episcopalian clergyman and immigrant

Science
Carl David Anderson, physicist who won 1936 Nobel Prize in Physics
Alexander P. Anderson, was an American plant physiologist, botanist, educator and inventor. His scientific experiments led to the discovery of "puffed rice", a starting point for a new breakfast cereal that was later advertised as "Food Shot From Guns"
Ernst Antevs, was a Swedish-American geologist and educator who made significant contributions to Quaternary geology, particularly geomorphology and geochronology
Hugo Leander Blomquist, was a Swedish-born American botanist. His well rounded expertise encompassed fungi, bacteria, bryophytes, algae, grasses, and ferns
John Elof Boodin, Swedish-born, philosopher and educator
Anton Julius Carlson, was a Swedish American physiologist. Carlson was Chairman of the Physiology Department at the University of Chicago from 1916 until 1940
Gunnar E. Carlsson, professor
John Carlstrom, Swedish-American astrophysicist, and Professor, Departments of Astronomy and Astrophysics, and Physics, at the University of Chicago
Walter Elmer Ekblaw, geologist, botanist, and college professor
Gustav Eisen, was a Swedish-American polymath. He became a member of California Academy of Sciences in 1874 and a Life Member in 1883
 Per Enflo, University Professor of Mathematics at Kent State University
 Otto Folin, was a Swedish-born American chemist who is best known for his groundbreaking work at Harvard University
Fritiof Fryxell, was an American educator, geologist and mountain climber, best known for his research and writing on the Teton Range of Wyoming
Lennart Heimer, was a Swedish-American neuroscientist and professor at the Massachusetts Institute of Technology and the University of Virginia. He was most noted for mapping circuits of the brain in the limbic lobe and basal ganglia, structures that play central roles in emotion processing and movement
 John Bertrand Johnson, Swedish-born American electrical engineer and physicist. He first explained in detail a fundamental source of random interference with information traveling on wires
Torkel Korling, Swedish-born American industrial, commercial, portrait and botanical photographer
 Ludwig Kumlien, was an American ornithologist. He took part in the Howgate Polar Expedition 1877-78 and collected a large number of bird specimens which led to the discovery of several new species
Thure Kumlien, was a Swedish-American ornithologist, naturalist, and taxidermist. A contemporary of Thoreau, Audubon, and Agassiz, he contributed much to the knowledge of the natural history of Wisconsin and its birds
 John Bernhard Leiberg, Swedish-American botanical explorer, forester, and bryologist
Paco Lagerstrom, was an applied mathematician and aeronautical engineer
 David R. Lindberg, malacologist, professor of integrative biology at the University of California, Berkeley
 Charles E. Lindblom, was an American academic who was Sterling Professor Emeritus of Political Science and Economics at Yale University
Waldemar Lindgren, was a Swedish-American geologist. Lindgren was one of the founders of modern economic geology
Carl Marcus Olson, has been credited as the discoverer of the process to make silicon pure.
 Roger Tory Peterson naturalist, ornithologist, illustrator and educator, held to be one of the founding inspirations for the 20th-century environmental movement, his father was a Swedish immigrant
 Carl-Gustaf Rossby, Swedish-born American meteorologist who first explained the large-scale motions of the atmosphere in terms of fluid mechanics. He identified and characterized both the jet stream and the long waves in the westerlies that were later named Rossby waves
Per Axel Rydberg, Swedish-born, American botanist who was the first curator of the New York Botanical Garden Herbarium
Glenn T. Seaborg, scientist who won the 1951 Nobel Prize in Chemistry
Thorsten Sellin, was a Swedish American sociologist at the University of Pennsylvania, a penologist and one of the pioneers of scientific criminology
Folke K. Skoog, Swedish-born American plant physiologist who was a pioneer in the field of plant growth regulators
 Orvar Swenson, Swedish-born American pediatric surgeon. He discovered the cause of Hirschsprung's disease and in 1948, with Alexander Bill, performed the first pull-through operation in a child with megacolon
 Max Tegmark, cosmologist and associate professor of physics at MIT
Stephan Thernstrom, Winthrop Research Professor of History Emeritus at Harvard University
 Ernest Harry Vestine, geophysicist and meteorologist
J. E. Wallace Wallin, was an American psychologist and an early proponent of educational services for the mentally handicapped
Nils Yngve Wessell, was a Swedish-American psychologist and the eighth president of Tufts University from 1953 to 1966, overseeing its transformation from a small liberal arts college to an internationally known research university
Peter Jansen Wester, was a Swedish-American agricultural botanist. Born in Sweden, he emigrated to the United States in 1897. Wester worked in several agricultural offices from 1897 to 1903, including leading the United States Department of Agriculture's experiment station and experimental plots for subtropical plants in Miami.
Olof B. Widlund, Swedish-American mathematician. He is well known for his leading role in and fundamental contributions to domain decomposition methods

Sports
 Josh Allen, American football quarterback currently with the Buffalo Bills
 Bob Backlund, American retired professional wrestler with an in-ring career spanning over 30 years.
 Earl W. Bascom, hall of fame rodeo champion, "father of modern rodeo"
 Tom Brady, American football quarterback; currently with the Tampa Bay Buccaneers but most famous for his tenure with the New England Patriots
 Lou Amundson, basketball player 
 Willie Bloomquist, baseball player
 Ernst Brandsten, diving coach
 Dustin Byfuglien, hockey player
 Bob Burnquist, skateboarder
 Swede Carlstrom, Major League shortstop for the Boston Red Sox
 John Carlson, hockey player
 Gary Cederstrom, Major League Baseball umpire
 Dick Enberg, sportscaster
 Norman Julius "Boomer" Esiason, retired American football quarterback, network commentator.
 Nancy Faust, stadium organist for the Chicago White Sox franchise in Major League Baseball
Ed Gustafson, professional athlete with the Brooklyn Dodgers
Rudolph Emil Hagberg, American football offensive lineman in the National Football League
 Dorothy Hamill, figure skater
Matt Hasselbeck, former quarterback of the Seattle Seahawks
 Walter Hellman, draughts player
 Mike Holmgren, former head coach of the Seattle Seahawks
 Jonas Jerebko, basketball player born to a Russian American father and a Swedish mother.
 Greta Johansson, diver
 Chester Johnston, former professional American football player
 Walter Johnson, pitcher and three time triple crown winner for the Washington Nationals/Senators, 1907-1927
 Swede Johnston, football player
 John Kvist, football player
Gus Lawson, was a record holding professional cyclist who died in a race
John Lawson, was a Swedish-American professional cyclist known as "The Terrible Swede"
Iver Lawson, was a world champion cyclist
 Ewa Mataya Laurance, professional pool player
 Edward Lindberg, athlete
 Charlie Lindgren, NHL goaltender
 Ryan Lindgren, NHL defenseman
 Freddie Lindstrom, baseball player
 Matthew Lindstrom, baseball player
 Greg Louganis, diver
 Pug Lund, football player
 Mike Lundin, ice hockey player
 Phil Mickelson, American professional golfer
 Jordy Nelson, American football player
 Nils. V. "Swede" Nelson
 Joakim Noah, basketball player
 Bob Nystrom, ice hockey player
 Eric Nystrom, ice hockey player
 Andrew James Oberlander, All-American halfback football player
 Gene Okerlund, "Mean" Gene Okerlund, was an American professional wrestling interviewer, announcer and television host.
 Bobo Olson, Swedish father, boxer
 Charles August Risberg, baseball player
 Ryne Sandberg, baseball player
 Ulf Samuelsson, Swedish-born, ice hockey player
 Ted Sundquist, bobsledder and football manager
 Cub Swanson, mixed martial artist
 Jeffery Taylor, former NBA player; born in Sweden to a Swedish mother and an American father
 Nick Theslof, first American soccer player to play in Europe, grandson of Vivi-Anne Hultén
 Oliver Wahlstrom, ice hockey player, Swedish father
 Adolph Frederick Youngstrom, football player
 Yukon Eric Eric Holmback, better known as Yukon Eric, was an American professional wrestler.

Writers
 Nelson Algren, writer
 Jack Anderson, journalist
 Ray Bradbury, science fiction and fantasy, mother was an immigrant from Sweden
Siv Cedering, poet
 Jonathan Franzen, novelist and essayist
 Greg Grandin, Pulitzer Prize-winning historian/author, paternal great-grandparents born in Sweden
Axel Carl Johan Gustafson, Swedish-born, writer
 Victor Davis Hanson, military historian, columnist, political essayist and former classics 
 James Jerpe, Pittsburgh sportswriter with a Swedish immigrant father and second-generation Swedish-American mother
 Gustavo A. Mellander, historian, columnist, political commentator, university administrator, college president; honored by the United States House of Representatives, 1985
 Edita Morris, writer
 Lars-Erik Nelson, political columnist
 Victor Folke Nelson, writer and prison reform advocate
 Sigurd Olson, writer and environmentalist
 Hans Ostrom, writer and professor
 Carl Sandburg, poet, historian, novelist, balladeer and folklorist
Ernst Skarstedt, Swedish-born, first author editor, and newspaper publisher
 Gerald Vizenor, novelist and literary critic

Colonial people
 Måns Andersson, Swedish-born, resident of New Sweden
 Jonas Bronck, Swedish-born, settler after whom the New York City borough of the Bronx was named
 Sven Gunnarsson, Swedish-born, resident of New Sweden
 Margaret Matson, Swedish-born, resident of New Sweden
 Eric Pålsson Mullica, Swedish-born, resident of New Sweden
 Peter Gunnarsson Rambo, Swedish-born, resident of New Sweden
 Reorus Torkillus, Swedish-born, resident of New Sweden

Educators
Alida Anderson, university professor and widely published education researcher
George Akerlof, economist
 Arnold Barton, educator and historian
 Linda Lee Cadwell, teacher; widow of Bruce Lee
 August Hjalmar Edgren, Swedish-born, linguistics and university professor
Emory Lindquist, was the president of Bethany College (1943–1953) in Lindsborg, Kansas and Wichita State University in Wichita, Kansas (1963–1968). He also served as a professor and authored many articles and books, especially regarding Swedish-American history
Claes Gösta Ryn, academic and educator

Other
Bob Arno, is a Swedish-American entertainer, known primarily as a comedy pickpocket, and more recently criminologist specializing in global street crime
 Leroy J. Alexanderson, last captain of the SS United States
 Alfred O. Andersson, publisher
 H. S. "Andy" Anderson. Swedish-American woodcarver, one of the recognized masters of 20th-century woodcarving, most famous for Scandinavian flat-plane style of woodcarving and caricature carving
 Bo Andersson, former General Motors executive, and present President/CEO of GAZ Group
 Lillian Asplund, Titanic survivor
William Lee Bergstrom, commonly known as The Suitcase Man or Phantom Gambler, was a gambler and high roller known for placing the largest bet in casino gambling history at the time amounting to $777,000 ($2.41 million present day amount) at the Horseshoe Casino, which he won
 Oscar Broneer, was a prominent Swedish American educator and archaeologist known in particular for his work on Ancient Greece. He is most associated with his discovery of the Temple of Isthmia, an important Panhellenic shrine dating from the seventh century B.C. 
Paul Carlson, was an American physician and medical missionary who served in Congo. He was killed in 1964 by rebel insurgents after being falsely accused of being an American spy
Victor Carlstrom, was a record-holding Swedish-American pioneer aviator. He set a cross-America flight air speed record
Neil Erickson, Swedish-born American pioneer in Cochise County, Arizona
 Eric Enstrom, Swedish-born American photographer. He became famous for his 1918 photograph of Charles Wilden in Bovey, Minnesota. The photo is now known as Grace and depicts Wilden saying a prayer over a simple meal
Axel Erlandson, was a Swedish American farmer who shaped trees as a hobby, and opened a horticultural attraction in 1947 called "The Tree Circus"
 Frank Erickson, was Arnold Rothstein's right-hand man and New York's largest bookmaker during the 1930s and 40s
Febold Feboldson, is an American folk hero who was a Swedish American plainsman and cloudbuster from Nebraska
 Abraham Fornander, journalist, judge and ethnologist
 Franklin S. Forsberg, publisher and diplomat
Nicholas Gustafson, was a Swedish immigrant who was mortally wounded in the James–Younger Gang bank raid in Northfield, Minnesota
 Eric A. Hegg, Swedish-American photographer who portrayed the people in Skagway, Bennett and Dawson City during the Klondike Gold Rush from 1897 to 1901
 Olof Jonsson, Swedish born engineer and psychic, famous for his long-distance telepathy experiment during the Apollo 14 mission in 1971.
Gary Larson, Swedish-American cartoonist. He is the creator of The Far Side, a single-panel cartoon series
 Charles Lindbergh, pioneering aviator famous for piloting the first solo non-stop flight across the Atlantic Ocean in 1927
 Erik Lindbergh, aviator
Godfrey Lundberg, Swedish-born, engraver
Jon Lindbergh, is a former underwater diver from the United States. He has worked as a United States Navy demolition expert and as a commercial diver, and was one of the world's earliest aquanauts in the 1960s. He was also a pioneer in cave diving. He is the oldest surviving child of aviator Charles Lindbergh
Raymond Nels Nelson, Chief of Staff Senator Claiborne Pell, R.I., former Bureau Chief, Providence Journal, unsolved murder 1981
Frank Olson, biochemist, he was covertly given LSD in the CIA's MKUltra program
Sigurd F. Olson, author, environmentalist, and advocate for the protection of wilderness.
Ingrid Pedersen, was a Swedish-American aviator. She was the first female pilot to fly over the North Pole
Buell Halvor Quain, ethnologist
Eric P. Quain, was a Swedish-born physician who co-founded the Quain and Ramstad Clinic in Bismarck, North Dakota. He also served as head of surgical services in France for the United States Army during World War I.
 Tom Rolf, was a Swedish-born American film editor who worked on at least 48 feature films in a career spanning over fifty years. Famous for editing Taxi Driver by Martin Scorsese.
Calvin Rutstrum, author of wilderness camping experiences and techniques books
Olaf Swenson, was a Seattle-based fur trader and adventurer active in Siberia and Alaska in the first third of the 20th century. His career intersected with activities of notable explorers of the period, and with the Russian Civil War. He is credited with leading the rescue of the Karluk survivors from Wrangel Island in 1914
Ivor Thord-Gray, Swedish-born, adventurer, ethnologist and linguist
 Jon Winroth, was an American wine critic who wrote in The New York Times
Valentin Wolfenstein, was a Swedish-American photographer who worked both in Stockholm and Los Angeles, California. He was one of the first photographers to use flash-lamps for photography

See also 
 List of Swedes

References

Americans
Swedish
 
Swedish